Dene Valley is a civil parish in County Durham, England. It had a population of 2,478 at the 2011 Census.

References

Civil parishes in County Durham